Clathurella rava is a species of sea snail, a marine gastropod mollusk in the family Clathurellidae.

Description
The size of an adult shell varies between 8 mm and 10 mm. The color of the shell is fulvous. The interstices of the ribs and the edge of the lip are stained purple-red. The anal sinus is wide and deep.

Distribution
This species occurs in the Pacific Ocean in the Gulf of California, Mexico and along Nicaragua, Costa Rica and Panama.

References

External links
 H. A. Pilsbry and H. N. Lowe, West Mexican and Central American Mollusks Collected by H. N. Lowe, 1929-31; Proceedings of the Academy of Natural Sciences of Philadelphia Vol. 84 (1932), pp. 33–144
 Brazier, J. 1876. A list of the Pleurotomidae collected during the Chevert expedition, with the description of the new species. Proceedings of the Linnean Society of New South Wales 1: 151–162

rava